The 1949 Northern Ireland general election was held on 19 February 1949.  The election became known as the Chapel-gate election because collections were held at churches in the Republic of Ireland to support the Nationalist Party campaign.

The election was held just after the Republic of Ireland's declaration of a republic.  The Unionists were able to use their majority in the Parliament of Northern Ireland to schedule the election at a time when many Protestants felt uneasy about development south of the border and as a result might be more likely to vote Unionist than for Labour candidates. This appears to have been borne out in the collapse of the Labour vote.

Results

|}

All parties shown. The only Socialist Republican Party candidate was elected unopposed. Electorate 846,719 (477,354 in contested seats); Turnout 79.3% (378,458).

Votes summary

Seats summary

References
Northern Ireland Parliamentary Election Results

See also
MPs elected in the Northern Ireland general election, 1949

1949
Northern Ireland general election
Northern Ireland general election
General election